Hypocalymma ericifolium is a member of the family Myrtaceae endemic to Western Australia.

It blooms between August and November producing cream-white flowers.

It is found along the coast in seasonally wet flat areas in the South West and Great Southern regions of Western Australia where it grows in sandy soils.

References

ericifolium
Endemic flora of Western Australia
Rosids of Western Australia
Plants described in 1867